Living is the second album by Irish musician Paddy Casey, it was released on 17 October 2003. It was re-released with a bonus disc featuring B-sides and live tracks on 26 November 2004.

Track listing

Original Release
 Livin'
 The Lucky One
 Saints & Sinners
 Bend Down Low
 Want It Can't Have It
 Don't Need Anyone
 Promised Land
 All In A Day
 Stumble
 Anyone That's Yet To Come
 Miracle
 Self Servin' Society

Bonus Disc
 Don't Need Anyone (Demo, B-side of Saints & Sinners)
 Shine (B-side of Whatever Gets You True)
 The Whole Of The Moon (Live with The Frames at the A Wee Night For Uaneen gig in the Olympia)
 Fear (Radio promo)
 The Lucky One (Demo, B-side of The Lucky One)
 Bend Down Low (Live at The Olympia)
 Reach Out (B-side of Want It Can't Have It)
 Can't Wait (Demo)
 Family Tree (Radio promo)

2003 albums
Paddy Casey albums